Johann Conrad Beissel (March 1, 1691 – July 6, 1768) was a German-born religious leader who in 1732 founded the Ephrata Community in the Province of Pennsylvania.

Background
Beissel was born in Eberbach then part of the Holy Roman Empire, and emigrated to Pennsylvania in 1720. Beissel had intended to join a commune of hermits founded there by Johannes Kelpius, but Kelpius had died in 1708. Beissel met with Conrad Matthaei, an associate who became his principal spiritual confidant. The group around Kelpius had arrived in 1694. They settled on a ridge above the Wissahickon Creek. There they prayed, meditated, and watched the stars looking for signs of the coming kingdom of Christ. They also taught children of the community. Some were celibate until death; others married.

In 1732 Beissel established a semi-monastic Baptist community called the Camp of the Solitary, with a convent (the Sister House) and a monastery (the Brother House) at Ephrata, in what is now Lancaster County, Pennsylvania. Celibacy was considered a virtue, but not obligatory. Each member adopted a new name, and Beissel was called Friedsam, to which the community afterward added the title of Gottrecht.  Believing families settled near the community, accepted Beissel as their spiritual leader, and worshipped with the community on the Sabbath. They were influenced by Schwarzenau Brethren thought.

Beissel served as the community's composer as well as its spiritual leader. He devised his own system of musical composition intended to simplify the process by relying on pre-determined sequences of "master notes" and "servant notes" to create harmony. This was mentioned in Thomas Mann's Doctor Faustus as a precursor to serialism.

Beissel's colony was noted for its printing facilities. After Beissel's death and the disruption of the war years of the American Revolution, the utopian community declined in population. Failing to attract sufficient members, its people assimilated into the general Baptist community.

Veganism
Beissel was one of the first vegetarians in North America who was motivated by Christian religious belief. The entire Ephrata community reportedly abstained from meat eating, which Beissel considered spiritually undesirable.

Beissel invented a vegan diet for the Ephrata community that excluded all meat, dairy, eggs and honey. His diet consisted of buckwheat, cabbage, fruit, green vegetables, potatoes and wheat.

Works 
ed. Peter C. Erb, Johann Conrad Beissel and the Ephrata Community. Mystical and Historical Texts, Lewiston, NY: 1985 (contains selected works)

References

Further reading 
Klein, Walter C. Johann Conrad Beissel: Mystic and Martinet 1690–1768. Philadelphia, 1942.

External links
 "Beisel, Johann Konrad (1690–1768)", Global Anabaptist Mennonite Encyclopedia Online
 Bach, Jeff: Voices of the turtledoves : the sacred world of Ephrata, Göttingen 2003: digital copy
  An examination of parallels between the music and worldviews of Beissel and Sun Ra

1691 births
1768 deaths
18th-century Christian mystics
American members of the Church of the Brethren
American veganism activists
Radical Pietism
Seventh Day Baptists
Emigrants from the Holy Roman Empire to the Thirteen Colonies
Founders of utopian communities
Clergy of Brethren denominations
Protestant mystics
People from Ephrata, Pennsylvania
Ephrata Cloister
People of colonial Pennsylvania